The penalty area or 18-yard box (also known less formally as the penalty box or simply box) is an area of an association football pitch. It is rectangular and extends 16.5m (18 yd) to each side of the goal and 16.5m (18 yd) in front of it. 

Within the penalty area is the penalty spot, which is 11m (12 yd) from the goal line, directly in-line with the centre of the goal. 

A penalty arc (often informally called "the D")  adjoins the penalty area, and encloses the area within 9.15m (10 yd) of the penalty spot. It does not form part of the penalty area and is only of relevance during the taking of a penalty kick, when any players inside the arc are adjudged to be encroaching.

Within the penalty area is another smaller rectangular area called the goal area (colloquially the "six-yard box"), which is delimited by two lines starting on the goal-line  from the goalposts and extending  into the pitch from the goal-line, and the line joining these. Goal kicks and any free kick by the defending team may be taken from anywhere in this area. Indirect free kicks awarded to the attacking team within the goal area are taken from the point on the line parallel to the goal line (the "six-yard line") nearest where the infringement occurred; they cannot be taken any closer to the goal line. Similarly drop-balls that would otherwise occur closer to the goal line are taken on this line.

Previously, penalty areas extended the width of the field, but were reduced to their current dimensions in 1901.

Functions

Fouls punishable by a direct free kick (i.e. handling the ball and most physical fouls), committed by the defensive team within the penalty area, may be penalised by a penalty kick. A penalty kick is taken from the penalty spot. The penalty spot is located 12 yards (10.97m) away from the goal line.

The penalty area has other functions, including: 
 Goalkeepers: The area delimiting the area in which a goalkeeper may legally handle the ball;
 Goal kicks and defensive free kicks: opponents must remain outside of the area and at least 10 yards away from the ball until the ball is kicked and clearly moves;
 Taking of penalty kicks: players other than the kicker and the goalkeeper must remain outside the area (and also the penalty arc) until the kick has been taken.

In play
In a typical game, for the majority of time the penalty area is occupied only by the goalkeeper. The attacking team generally aims to get the ball and their own players into the defending team's penalty area, and a high percentage of goals in professional football are scored from within the penalty area. Usually during attacking set pieces, including corners, a large number of both attacking and defending players are in the penalty area and, although illegal, grappling between players is frequently observed.

References

See also
 Penalty shoot-out (association football)
 Association football pitch

Laws of association football
Association football terminology

fr:Lexique du football#S
ru:Футбольное поле#Штрафная площадь